Lists of Australian rules football leagues include:
List of Australian rules football leagues in Australia – men's leagues in Australia.
Australian rules football leagues in regional Queensland – leagues in Queensland, Australia.
List of former South Australian regional football leagues – defunct leagues in South Australia.
List of women's Australian rules football leagues – women's leagues around the world.
Countries playing Australian rules football – men's leagues around the world.

Leagues